The men's Raceboard heavy competition at the 2002 Asian Games in Busan was held from 3 to 9 October 2002.

Schedule
All times are Korea Standard Time (UTC+09:00)

Results

References

2002 Asian Games Report, Page 575

External links
Results

Men's Raceboard heavy